Zwierzyniec is a village in the administrative district of Gmina Siedlisko, within Nowa Sól County, Lubusz Voivodeship, in western Poland.

The village has a population of 40.

References

Zwierzyniec